"Drive On" is a song by British pop music group Brother Beyond, released as the lead single from their second album, Trust, on 16 October 1989. It was their fifth consecutive hit to peak inside the top 40 of the UK Singles Chart, reaching number 39 in November 1989.

Track listings
7-inch and cassette single
A. "Drive On" – 4:06
B. "Drive On (Dream On)" – 3:38

12-inch single
A. "Drive On" (So Strong mix) – 6:23
B. "Drive On" (Apple mix) – 6:05

Limited-edition 12-inch single
A. "Drive On" (Auto mix) – 5:53
B. "Drive On" (Dr Boozie's Revenge mix) – 4:58

CD single
 "Drive On"
 "Drive On" (So Strong mix)
 "Be My Twin" (US remix)

Japanese mini-CD single
 "Drive On"
 "Drive On" (So Strong mix)

Charts

References

 Paul Gambaccini, Tim Rice, Jonathan Rice (1993), British Hit Singles, Guinness Publishing ltd,

External links
 Nathan Moore Official Website

1989 singles
1989 songs
Brother Beyond songs
Parlophone singles